Anrode is a former municipality in the Unstrut-Hainich-Kreis district of Thuringia, Germany. It was created in January 1997 by the merger of the former municipalities Lengefeld, Bickenriede, Hollenbach and Zella. On 1 January 2023 it was disbanded, and its constituent communities were distributed over 3 other municipalities:
Bickenriede and Zella to Dingelstädt
Hollenbach to Mühlhausen
Dörna and Lengefeld to Unstruttal

Notable people

 Johann Friedrich Wender (1655-1729), organ builder, born in Dörna, had his workshop in Mühlhausen
 George Atzerodt (1835-1865), conspirator of the assassination on Abraham Lincoln, born in Dörna
 Karl Künstler (1901-probably 1945), SS Obersturmbannführer, camp commander of the Flossenbürg concentration camp, born in Zella

References

Unstrut-Hainich-Kreis
Former municipalities in Thuringia